Colegio Agustín Codazzi  is an Italian international school in La Florida, Caracas, Venezuela.

Data
 
The "Colegio Codazzi" has Scuola infanzia “O. Molinari” (preschool), Scuola elementare “O.Molinari” (primary school) and Scuola media “Leonardo Da Vinci” (middle school) through Scuola secondaria (Liceo scientifico “Venezuela”) (upper secondary school).

It is named after Agostino Codazzi, who was an Italian military, scientist, geographer, cartographer, and governor of Barinas (1846-1847) and made his main investigations and cartographic work in Venezuela and Colombia, thereby creating for both countries a complete set of maps and statistics after the tumultuous post-independence years from the Spanish Empire.

The "Collegio Agostino Codazzi" (as is called in Italian) is the main Italian school of Caracas and Venezuela.

Furthermore, the Codazzi is officially labeled as an overseas Italian school recognized by the Ministry of Foreign Affairs of Italy.

History
The Codazzi was founded by Italian immigrants in 1951. In the 1960s it had nearly one thousand students, when the Italian colony was the biggest immigrant colony in Caracas. In the 1960s and 1970s it was one of the two main European schools of Caracas, with the German Colegio Humboldt. In those decades in the Italian community of Caracas the two more attended schools by students were the Codazzi and the Colegio Amerigo Vespucci, with rivalry also in sport matches (like soccer).

The Codazzi began following also a Venezuelan curriculum in 1986, that was temporarily closed in 2011

Recently the school has suffered economic problems because of the recent Venezuelan crisis, but it has overcome the difficulties thanks in part to the help of the Italian Embassy in Caracas.

Notable alumni 
 Princess Victoria Romanovna, member of the former Russian imperial family

Notes

See also

 Colegio Amerigo Vespucci
 Colegio De Marta
 Italo-Venezuelans
 Italian language in Venezuela

International schools in Caracas
1951 establishments in Venezuela
Educational institutions established in 1951
Italian international schools in South America